The Commander of the Land Forces of the Armed Forces of the Kyrgyz Republic is the professional head of the Kyrgyz Army. He is  responsible for the administration and the operational control of the Kyrgyz Army. The current Commander is Colonel Almazbek Karasartov.

List of Chiefs

Kyrgyz Army

Kyrgyzstani Ground Forces

References

General Staff (Kyrgyzstan)
Kyrgyzstan